KPCL may refer to:

 Krishnapatnam Port
 Karnataka Power Corporation Limited
 KPCL (FM), a radio station (95.7 FM) licensed to Farmington, New Mexico, United States